The Library of Congress Recording Sessions refers to a March 1940 session of recordings Woody Guthrie made in Washington, D.C., for Alan Lomax. They were catalogued in the United States Library of Congress. They are notable as the first recordings made of Woody Guthrie. They contain several traditional songs and three of Guthrie's best known songs, "So Long It's Been Good To Know You", "Talking Dust Bowl Blues" and "Do-Re-Me". The session is also interesting for Guthrie's autobiographical memories of Oklahoma, riding the freight trains and observations on life and America's great depression in conversation with Lomax.

These were not intended to be commercial recordings, but some tracks were later released on an Elektra Records three-LP set titled Woody Guthrie: Library of Congress Recordings in 1964.

Rounder Records released the recordings in 1988 on both LP and compact disc.

Track listing

See also 
 Woody Guthrie discography
 Alan Lomax

References 

Woody Guthrie albums
1964 albums
Albums published posthumously
Albums produced by Alan Lomax